Michelle Wolf (born June 21, 1985) is an American comedian, writer, producer, and television host. She worked as a contributor and writer for Late Night with Seth Meyers and The Daily Show with Trevor Noah. She spoke as the featured performer at the 2018 White House Correspondents' Dinner. She hosted the Netflix comedy talk show series The Break with Michelle Wolf and performed in the 2019 stand-up comedy special Joke Show.

Early life and education 
Wolf was born in Hershey, Pennsylvania, where she grew up with two older brothers. She graduated from Hershey High School in 2003. She graduated from the College of William & Mary in 2007, where she majored in kinesiology and was a member of the cardiovascular physiology lab. She was on the track and field team while in high school and college, competing in the high jump and 400 meter and 800 meter runs before an injury caused her to stop competing.

Career
Wolf was employed at Bear Stearns from 2007 to 2008, later at JPMorgan Chase, working for almost four years in mutual funds and managing accounts between the two banks. Around the time of the buyout by JPMorgan, Wolf started improv classes at the Upright Citizens Brigade and the Peoples Improv Theater (PIT). Her frustration with the imperfect and ephemeral nature of improv and the encouragement from classmates got her to audit a stand-up class at the People's Improvisational Theater aka The PIT. Her first appearance on late-night television was in July 2014, when she went on Late Night with Seth Meyers. She re-appeared on numerous segments on Late Night, often as her fictional persona, "Grown-Up Annie", an adult version of Little Orphan Annie. She later held additional positions on the same show, including, most recently, as writing supervisor.

In November 2015, Comedy Central released the entirety of Now Hiring, a web series hosted by Wolf, on YouTube. Wolf is a regular at the Comedy Cellar in New York City. In April 2016, she joined The Daily Show with Trevor Noah as a contributor. Wolf has said that she learned a lot about comedy working for Seth Meyers and Trevor Noah.

In August 2016, she performed her stand-up show So Brave at the Edinburgh Festival, which was her first performance outside North America.

Wolf's television work in the United Kingdom also includes an appearance on Live At The Apollo in late 2016 and an appearance as a panelist on the UK comedy game show 8 Out of 10 Cats Does Countdown in early 2017, partnering with team captain and British stand-up comedian Jon Richardson. She appeared on the same show later on in the year, this time partnering with Sean Lock. On November 20, 2016, Wolf appeared as a guest on Frankie Boyle's American Autopsy on BBC2, reflecting on the result of the 2016 United States presidential election. She also appeared on an episode of 8 Out of 10 Cats in January 2017, partnering with English footballer Jermaine Jenas and team captain Rob Beckett, and partnered with David Mitchell on The Big Fat Quiz of the Year 2018.

On December 2, 2017, Wolf made her HBO stand-up debut, Michelle Wolf: Nice Lady, which was taped at the Skirball Center for the Performing Arts in New York City in mid-August 2017.

2018 White House Correspondents' Dinner appearance 

On April 28, 2018, Wolf was the featured entertainer at the White House Correspondents' Dinner. U.S. President Donald Trump did not attend the dinner for the second consecutive year, sending Sarah Huckabee Sanders, the White House Press Secretary.

Wolf delivered a 19-minute comedy routine and was both praised and criticized for her "harsh and stinging" jokes aimed at the Trump administration—most notably at Sanders—and at the media itself. Wolf's criticism of journalism was called by one commentator "the most consequential monologue so far of the Donald Trump era." Managers at C-SPAN radio considered the monologue so risqué that they stopped broadcasting it half-way through, worrying that she might violate FCC indecency guidelines and that they might get fined. Wolf's joke about Sanders using the ashes of facts to create her perfect eye makeup became the most controversial issue among the criticisms aimed at Wolf's presentation:I actually really like Sarah. I think she's very resourceful. She burns facts, and then she uses that ash to create a perfect smoky eye. Like maybe she's born with it, maybe it's lies. It's probably lies.

Journalists including Maggie Haberman of The New York Times, Mika Brzezinski of MSNBC, and Andrea Mitchell of NBC News, criticized Wolf on Twitter for targeting Sanders. Ed Henry of Fox News stated that "[i]t was disgusting, despicable." CBS News executives reportedly considered ending its participation in future dinners, but later changed its stance after the network was assured that the Correspondents' Association would "seriously consider changes to the dinner's format." Former press secretary Sean Spicer tweeted, "Tonight's #WHCD was a disgrace" to which Wolf replied, "Thank you!" The next day, Trump called several outside advisors to criticize the comedian, and he sent a series of tweets saying that the "so-called comedian" and the "filthy 'comedian' totally bombed." and called for the dinner to be discontinued or "start[ed] over."

Wolf questioned her critics from the media: "Why are you guys making this about Sarah's looks? I said she burns facts and uses the ash to create a *perfect* smoky eye. I complimented her eye makeup and her ingenuity of materials." In an interview with Terry Gross on NPR, Wolf said that the joke was not about Sanders' looks at all, it was about her lies, and there is not really a need to defend it in the first place. She said she did not attack any of the women's physical appearances, unlike some male politicians such as Mitch McConnell's neck or Chris Christie's weight, but "as a woman, I have access to hit women in a way that men might not be able to hit them with jokes." Talking about her performance, "I wouldn't change a single word that I said. I'm very happy with what I said, and I'm glad I stuck to my guns."

Other journalists, including Jacob Soboroff of NBC News, Joan Walsh of CNN, Amanda Hess of The New York Times, and Wesley Lowery of The Washington Post, tweeted their support for Wolf and took the White House Correspondents' Association (WHCA) to task for the statement issued by its president, Margaret Talev. Talev wrote that the program "was meant to offer a unifying message about [the WHCA's] common commitment to a vigorous and free press while honoring civility, great reporting and scholarship winners, not to divide people," and that Wolf's "monologue was not in the spirit of that mission." James Poniewozik, writing for The New York Times, criticized the WHCA for disavowing Wolf, saying that she was "defending the mission of the White House press: sticking up for the truth. Michelle Wolf had the WHCA's back Saturday night, even if it didn't have hers the day after." The New Yorker's Masha Gessen was particularly impressed with Wolf's criticism of journalism, praising her for how she "exposed the obscenity of the fictions" of "The Age of Trump".

Many comedians came to Wolf's defense, including Jimmy Kimmel, Trevor Noah, Seth Meyers, Adam Conover, Dave Chappelle, Kathy Griffin, Guy Branum, Anthony Atamanuik. and Jimmy Dore. Stephen Colbert, who was the featured entertainer at the 2006 edition of the event, joked on The Late Show, "This is the correspondents' dinner, celebrating the freedom of speech. You can't just say whatever you want!" Nell Scovell writing for Vulture criticized journalists Haberman, Brzezinski, and Mitchell for what Scovell called a "manufactured catfight" between Wolf and Sanders. Describing the ensuing controversy, Scovell wrote, "[w]omen, comedians, and the media all grabbed each other's hair and threw each other to the floor while men watched and cheered." Wolf was later grateful for the controversy, which helped sell out tickets for her March 2018 stand-up show at Carolines on Broadway, tweeting "Hey @GOP thanks for the free publicity [kiss emoji]."

Wolf's last line in her speech was “Flint still doesn't have clean water”, referring to the long-running man-made water crisis in the city of Flint, Michigan.

The Break with Michelle Wolf 

Wolf hosted a weekly Netflix talk show, The Break with Michelle Wolf, which premiered May 27, 2018 and was discontinued on August 18, 2018. Before the show premiered, it was announced that it would "take a break from the seriousness of late-night comedy" and "instead of making the news fun, she'll make fun of everything and everybody. There will be no preaching or political agenda—unless it's funny." She was also an executive producer for the show. Netflix released the trailer to coincide with her appearance at 2018 White House Correspondents' Dinner. Netflix ordered a 10-episode season that premiered in May 2018 and aired over 10 weeks, with the series finale on July 29, 2018. The show was cancelled after one season, having not drawn enough of a viewership to secure a renewal.

Joke Show
In December 2019, Netflix released Joke Show, a stand-up comedy special written and performed by Wolf.

Michelle Wolf is featured on Netflix's "Bill Burr Presents: Friends Who Kill" in 2022.

Personal life
Wolf is an avid runner, and took part in a marathon in 2005 (Las Vegas), and a  ultramarathon in 2018 at the Bonneville Salt Flats in Utah. On her Netflix special "Joke Show," she mentioned that in the past, she has had an abortion.

Notes

References

External links

 
Michelle Wolf COMPLETE REMARKS at 2018 White House Correspondents' Dinner (C-SPAN)

1985 births
Living people
21st-century American comedians
21st-century American women writers
American comedy writers
American stand-up comedians
American women comedians
Bear Stearns people
Comedians from Pennsylvania
JPMorgan Chase employees
People from Hershey, Pennsylvania
William & Mary Tribe women's track and field athletes
Writers from Pennsylvania